John Nicholas was an English soldier and politician who sat in the House of Commons  in 1656 and 1659.

Nicholas was of Chepstow and was a captain in Commonwealth army.  He became governor of Chepstow in January 1651 and was added to the High Court of Justice on 25 June 1651.  In 1656, he was elected Member of Parliament for Monmouthshire in the Second Protectorate Parliament.  He was appointed steward to hold courts for conservation of the River Severn from 1656 to 1657 and was governor of Chepstow again in 1659. He was re-elected MP for Monmouthshire for the Third Protectorate Parliament in 1659.
 
On the Restoration, he went abroad. He received a pardon and a pass as one of those whom the king wished to call home.

References

Year of birth missing
Year of death missing
English MPs 1656–1658
English MPs 1659
Roundheads